Morgan is a city in Bosque County in Central Texas, United States. The city's population was 490 at the 2010 census.

Geography

Morgan is located at  (32.016940, –97.606863).

Demographics

As of the census of 2000, there were 485 people, 164 households, and 122 families residing in the city. The population density was 649.3 people per square mile (249.7/km). There were 197 housing units at an average density of 263.8/sq mi (101.4/km). The racial makeup of the city was 75.26% White, 0.82% African American, 3.71% Native American, 16.70% from other races, and 3.51% from two or more races. Hispanic or Latino of any race were 35.26% of the population.

There were 164 households, out of which 39.0% had children under the age of 18 living with them, 56.7% were married couples living together, 12.2% had a female householder with no husband present, and 25.6% were non-families. 23.2% of all households were made up of individuals, and 13.4% had someone living alone who was 65 years of age or older. The average household size was 2.96 and the average family size was 3.49.

In the city, the population was spread out, with 34.4% under the age of 18, 6.8% from 18 to 24, 26.8% from 25 to 44, 19.8% from 45 to 64, and 12.2% who were 65 years of age or older. The median age was 32 years. For every 100 females, there were 109.1 males. For every 100 females age 18 and over, there were 98.8 males.

The median income for a household in the city was $22,188, and the median income for a family was $25,441. Males had a median income of $19,688 versus $20,500 for females. The per capita income for the city was $8,713. About 26.2% of families and 27.6% of the population were below the poverty line, including 32.4% of those under age 18 and 15.5% of those age 65 or over.

Education
Morgan is served by the Morgan Independent School District.

Climate
The climate in this area is characterized by hot, humid summers and generally mild to cool winters.  According to the Köppen climate classification, Morgan has a humid subtropical climate, Cfa on climate maps.

References

Cities in Bosque County, Texas
Cities in Texas